Pamela Harrison is an American poet and educator. She is the author of six poetry collections, most recently, What to Make of It (Turning Point, 2012). Her poems have been published in literary journals and magazines including Poetry, Beloit Poetry Journal, Georgia Review, Green Mountains Review, Cimarron Review, and Yankee Magazine. Her honors include fellowships from the MacDowell Colony and the Vermont Studio Center, as well as the PEN Northern New England Discovery Poet Award.

Harrison was born and raised in Oklahoma City, and earned a B.A. from Smith College, and an M.F.A. in creative writing from the Vermont College of Fine Arts.  She has taught English literature and creative writing for the University System of New Hampshire and Dartmouth College as adjunct faculty. She was married to Dr. Dennis McCullough (1944-2016), author of My Mother, Your Mother (HarperCollins, 2008) and has one daughter, Katherine Parlee McCullough (b. 1977.) She has two grandsons. Harrison lives in Norwich, Vermont.

Published works
Full-length poetry collections
 What to Make of It (Turning Point, 2012)
 Out of Silence (David Robert Books, 2009)
 Okie Chronicles (David Robert Books, 2005)
 Stereopticon (David Robert Books, 2004)

Chapbooks
 Pamela Harrsion Greatest Hits (Pudding House, 2002)
 Noah’s Daughter (Panhandler Chapbook Competition winner, Series #1, University of West Florida, 1988)

Honors and awards
 2002 PEN Northern New England Discovery Poet Award
 1988 Panhandler Prize

References

External links
 Author website
 Review: Nashua Telegraph > December 20, 2009 > Poetry Breaks Silence, A Review by Mike Pride of Out of Silence by Pamela Harrison
 Poems: PoetryFish > Vol. 6, issue 1 > Poems by Pamela Harrsion

American women poets
Living people
Writers from Oklahoma City
Smith College alumni
People from Norwich, Vermont
University of New Hampshire faculty
Vermont College of Fine Arts alumni
Poets from Oklahoma
Poets from Vermont
Year of birth missing (living people)
American women academics
21st-century American women